Myongji University Station is located in Yongin, South Korea, on the EverLine.

Seoul Metropolitan Subway stations
Railway stations opened in 2013
Metro stations in Yongin